The Mathematical Experience (1981) is a book by Philip J. Davis and Reuben Hersh that discusses the practice of modern mathematics from a historical and philosophical perspective. The book discusses the psychology of mathematicians, and gives examples of famous proofs and outstanding problems. It goes on to speculate about what a proof really means, in relationship to actual truth. Other topics include mathematics in education and some of the math that occurs in computer science.

The first paperback edition won a U.S. National Book Award in Science. It is cited by some mathematicians as influential in their decision to continue their studies in graduate school; and has been hailed as a classic of mathematical literature.
On the other hand, Martin Gardner disagreed with some of the authors' philosophical opinions.

A new edition, published in 1995, includes exercises and problems, making the book more suitable for classrooms. There is also The Companion Guide to The Mathematical Experience, Study Edition. Both were co-authored with Elena Marchisotto. Davis and Hersh wrote a follow-up book, Descartes' Dream: The World According to Mathematics (Harcourt, 1986), and each has written other books with related themes, such as Mathematics And Common Sense: A Case of Creative Tension by Davis and What is Mathematics, Really? by Hersh.

Notes

References

External links 

 Book Review of the 1995 edition, by Kenneth C. Millett at the American Mathematical Society.
 The Mathematical Experience from the Internet Archive

Books about mathematics
National Book Award-winning works
1981 non-fiction books
Collaborative non-fiction books